Adalbert "Béla" Gurath Jr. (born 28 April 1942) is a retired Romanian fencer. He competed in the individual épée event at the 1960 Summer Olympics. His father, Adalbert Gurath Sr., also represented Romania in fencing at the Olympics.

References

External links
 

1942 births
Living people
Romanian male fencers
Romanian épée fencers
Olympic fencers of Romania
Fencers at the 1960 Summer Olympics
Sportspeople from Cluj-Napoca